"La Pas Ma La" is the first ragtime composition to be published by minstrel performer Ernest Hogan in 1895. With his troupe, the Georgia Graduates, he performed a dance step and ditty with the name "Pasmala".
Hogan created a comedy dance called the "La Pas Ma La" , which consisted of a walk forward with three steps back. In 1895, he wrote and composed a song based on this dance called "pasmala". The song's chorus was:

Hand upon yo' head, let your mind roll back,
Back, back back and look at the stars
Stand up rightly, dance it brightly
That's the Pas Ma La.

References

External links 

 La Pas Ma La Box 141, Item 166 Lester Levy sheet music collection Johns Hopkins The Sheridan Libraries

1895 songs
Rags